Jerzy Wróblewski (5 September 1926 in Wilno - 31 May 1990 in Switzerland) was a Polish legal theorist and a professor at the University of Łódź.

Biography 
Wróblewski graduated at the Jagiellonian University in 1947 with master's degree in law and completed postgraduate studies in philosophy. After obtaining his Ph.D. in 1949, he moved to the University of Łódź in 1951, where he was appointed head of chair of the theory of state and law. He achieved habilitation in 1970. He remained at Łódź till his death, where he performed a number of functions: pro-dean of the Faculty of Law (1953-1955, and 1958-1962), dean of the Faculty of Law (1955-1956, and 1962-1964), pro-rector (1965-1968), and rector (1981-1984).

He served as a judge of the State Tribunal of the Republic of Poland. He was a member of the Polish Academy of Sciences and the Finnish Society of Sciences and Letters. Wróblewski published in jurisprudence and in the organization of state administration.

Publications (selected)
The following list contains English editions of J. Wróblewski's books and separately published works:

Between legalism and finalism. Duncker und Humblot, 1984
Cognition of norms and cognition through norms. Università degli Studi di Trento. Dipartimento di Teoria, Storia e Ricerca Sociale, 1983
Fuzziness of legal system. Finnish Lawyers' Society, 1983
Law and philosophy. Springer-Verlag, 1977
Law-making and hierarchies of values. Duncker & Humblot, 1987 
Legal reasonings in legal interpretation. Centre National Belge de Recherches de Logique, 1969
Morality of progress : social philosophy of Leo Petrażycki. Franz Steiner Verlag, 1982.
Presuppositions of legal reasoning. D. Reidel Publishing Company, cop. 1985
Problems of ontological complexity of law. Universidad del Pais Vasco : Centro de Análisis, Lógiċa e Informática Iuridica, 1986
State and law in marxist theory of state and law. Wayne State University Law School, 1976
The rational law-maker : general theory and socialist experience. Edizioni Scientifiche Italiane, 1987

See also

House of Wróblewski (Lubicz)

References

1926 births
1990 deaths
Legal writers
Academic staff of the University of Łódź
20th-century Polish judges
Philosophers of law
Lawyers from Vilnius
Jagiellonian University alumni
Jerzy